Villa Ortúzar is one of the neighbourhoods of Buenos Aires. Its limits are La Pampa St., Forest Ave., Elcano Ave., Ferrocarril General Urquiza railroads, Del Campo Ave., Combatientes de Malvinas Ave. and Triunvirato Ave.

The "Villa" received its name as after Esq. Santiago Francisco de Ortúzar y Mendiola, a basque businessman who bought the "area" the 26th of April of 1862 paying for it 265,000 pesos.

Neighbourhoods of Buenos Aires